Joo Min-kyu  (born 13 April 1990) is a South Korean football player who plays for Jeju United.

Career
Joo was selected by Goyang Hi FC in the 2014 K League Challenge draft after graduating from Hanyang University.

Career statistics

Club

Honours 
Individual
K League 1 top scorer: 2021
K League 1 Best XI: 2021, 2022

References

External links 
 

1990 births
Living people
South Korean footballers
Association football midfielders
Association football forwards
Goyang Zaicro FC players
K League 2 players
Hanyang University alumni
Seoul E-Land FC players
Gimcheon Sangmu FC players
Ulsan Hyundai FC players
K League 1 players